Lamsfuß may refer to:

People
 Mark Lamsfuß (born 1994), German badminton player
 Ulrich Lamsfuß (1971), German artist

Places
 Lamsfuß (de), village in Wipperfürth, North Rhine-Westphalia, Germany